Egoz is a Hebrew word meaning 'nut'. It can refer to several things:

 Egoz (ship) was a Jewish immigrant ship which sank off the coast of Morocco on January 10, 1961.
 The Egoz Reconnaissance Unit ( Yehidath Egoz) is an Israeli guerrilla infantry unit.
 Egoz Valley (Nahal Egoz), see Wadi al-Joz